Hsu Hsin-ying (born 23 April 1972) is a Taiwanese politician. Prior to joining the Kuomintang (KMT) in 2009, Hsu was an independent. She left the KMT to found the Minkuotang (MKT) in 2015. In 2019, the MKT was absorbed by the Congress Party Alliance.

Education and early career
Hsu graduated from Taipei Municipal Zhongshan Girls High School, where she played basketball, softball and athletics. She attended National Cheng Kung University to study engineering. Hsu then obtained a masters and doctorate in the field from National Chiao Tung University and began work as a researcher for the Ministry of the Interior. She then moved to the private sector, joining the Da Shi Dai Surveying and Construction Consulting Company. She also taught at Minghsin University of Science and Technology.

Political career

Political beginnings
Hsu first ran for office in 2005, for a position on the Hsinchu County Council, for which she was defeated. She organized a bid for the Legislative Yuan in 2008, resulting in the same outcome. After joining the Kuomintang in 2009, she won and served on the county council, before winning a Legislative Yuan seat in the 2012 elections as a member of the Kuomintang. In that election, Hsu won 171,466 votes, the most of any one candidate that year. Hsu was reelected to the KMT's Central Standing Committee in August 2014, but did not serve a full one-year term. Instead, she split from the party in January 2015, and founded the Minkuotang (MKT) in March, serving as the MKT's first chair.

2016 campaigns
Hsu ran for reelection in Hsinchu County until People First Party chairman James Soong named her the vice presidential candidate for his 2016 presidential campaign in November 2015. The PFP–MKT coalition finished third in the presidential election and the MKT lost its only seat in the Legislative Yuan.

Later political career
Hsu contested the Hsinchu County magistracy in 2018. She finished second of four candidates, with 32.29% of the vote.

Following her loss to Yang Wen-ke, Hsu resigned the Minkuotang leadership on 29 November 2018, and the party merged into the Congress Party Alliance on 25 January 2019.

References

External links

 

1972 births
Living people
Members of the 8th Legislative Yuan
Kuomintang Members of the Legislative Yuan in Taiwan
Hsinchu County Members of the Legislative Yuan
National Chiao Tung University alumni
National Cheng Kung University alumni
Taiwanese politicians of Hakka descent
21st-century Taiwanese women politicians
Taiwanese political party founders
Leaders of political parties in Taiwan
Minkuotang politicians
Taiwanese women engineers
21st-century women engineers
Taiwanese women founders
Women local politicians in Taiwan